Eadestown is a townland and parish in County Kildare, Ireland. It is situated on the R410 Regional Road south of Naas, between Naas and Blessington, County Wicklow.

Eadestown Parish

The Parish of Eadestown is composed of the civil parishes of Rathmore, Kilteel, Tipper and Haynestown. Its churches include the Church of the Immaculate Conception, Eadestown and St. Laurence O'Toole, Kilteel.

In 1995-2004 the parish was run by the "racing" priest Fr. Sean Breen. Breen's "Heavenly syndicate" won €170,000 from one of its horses in 2002-2003.

The parish church was altered and renovated by the noted church architect John Joseph Robinson, of Robinson and Keefe Architects for Rev.W. Lockhart P.P. in 1923. He subsequently designed the cathedral of Our Lady and St. Nicholas in Galway.

Tickell Memorial Fountain
A cast-iron fountain in the village, dated 1899, was erected in memory of Captain Thomas Tickell (1817-98) of Cheltenham in Gloucester by his County Kildare tenantry. It was cast by Tonge and Taggart (established 1869) of Dublin to designs by John Joseph O'Callaghan (c.1838-1905) of Nassau Street, Dublin. The fountain was designed for drinking at three levels with the lion-head spouts for humans, the circular trough for horses and the quarter-circle dishes at ground level for hounds. The fountain is now disused.

Sport
Eadestown GAA club is based in Eadestown. The team won the Kildare Senior Football Championship in 1970. The club fields underage teams and also competes in the Kildare Senior Championship.

Punchestown Racecourse is also located in Eadestown and this hosts many annual meetings, including the national hunt festival, which is usually held in late April.

Notable people
 Tadhg Beirne, plays rugby union in the Pro14 for Munster. Previously played for Leinster and Scarlets. 2018 Guinness PRO14 Players' Player of the Year Award 2018.
 Jimmy O'Brien, plays for the Ireland national rugby team

See also
 List of towns and villages in Ireland

References

Towns and villages in County Kildare